Miriam Oremans (born 9 September 1972) is a former professional female tennis player from the Netherlands. On 26 July 1993 she reached her career-high singles ranking of number 25.

She did not win any singles titles (Oremans did have two Satellite tournament wins in 1989), but did win three titles in doubles. In 1992 she was runner-up together with Jacco Eltingh in the Mixed Doubles finals of Wimbledon.

Her biggest achievement came during the 2000 Summer Olympics in Sydney where she won the silver medal in doubles, partnering Kristie Boogert, losing the final match to Venus and Serena Williams.

Major finals

Olympic finals

Doubles: 1 (0–1)

WTA Tour finals

Singles 5

Doubles 12 (3–9)

ITF finals

Singles Finals: (2-2)

Doubles Finals: (1-2)

References
 ITF site

External links
 
 

1972 births
Living people
Dutch female tennis players
Olympic tennis players of the Netherlands
Olympic silver medalists for the Netherlands
People from Sint-Michielsgestel
Tennis players at the 2000 Summer Olympics
Olympic medalists in tennis
Hopman Cup competitors
Medalists at the 2000 Summer Olympics
Sportspeople from North Brabant
20th-century Dutch women